North Dorset Railway (previously known as the Shillingstone Station Project, the North Dorset Railway Trust and the Shillingstone Railway Project) is a heritage railway based at Shillingstone railway station on the former Somerset and Dorset Joint Railway.

The project's present aim is to restore the current leased length of one quarter of a mile of  single track mainline with a passing loop between the platforms. Double track has been laid through the station using 95 bullhead rail extending to the current northern and southern boundaries. A siding to serve the loading dock will soon be completed. A planning application was submitted in December 2020 to extend a single track north over Lamb House Bridge to Bere Marsh, with the ultimate aim to provide a rail link to Sturminster Newton, working in harmony with the North Dorset Trailway. 
The signal box, down platform shelter, permanent way huts, signals and pole route have been rebuilt. The NDRT rebuilt the 400 foot down platform wall and replaced and repaired the platform edge slabs. The North Dorset Trailway has been rerouted to run alongside the  'down' platform on a new embankment.

There is a small museum on site. The Station Gardens are also a prominent feature for the 28,000 visitors that come annually. The NDR membership continues to grow and in 2020 exceeded 500.

Buildings

The main station building currently houses a cafe and shop with recently upgraded toilet facilities which include a designated accessible toilet and baby changing facilities. The registered museum displays some of the artifacts donated over the years. The Signal box has been rebuilt and fitted with one signal. The south end of the up platform has been rebuilt and the picnic area above landscaped with a colourful garden - an outdoor 'O' scale model railway was built there but was removed in 2019. A new siding was laid to accommodate the catering carriage at present outside the main station platform which serves as additional café accommodation and is available for hire for private functions. The down platform waiting shelter has been rebuilt in its original position and serves as storage.

Stations
Sturminster Newton - A long-term aim of the NDR is to restore the line to Sturminster Newton as stated in the current NDR literature. The 'Railway Garden' in the centre of the town commemorates the previous route of the Somerset and Dorset Joint Railway. NDR has engaged with local councillors and officers to plan a gateway feature including a signal, interpretation boards and a level crossing gate as the trackbed enters Sturminster Newton.
Shillingstone - the base for North Dorset Railway - the only remaining station built to a Dorset Central Railway design in 1863
Stourpaine & Durweston Halt - in private hands

Activity

In 2009,  of the up main track through the station was laid and ballasted using 110a and 113a flat bottom rail and wooden sleepers. The Ruston & Hornsby  diesel shunter was moved from the isolated goods dock. This was the first standard gauge loco on the Somerset & Dorset mainline south of the Mendips and north of Blandford, since the demolition train departed in July 1967, exactly 42 years before.

Progress in 2010 included acquiring a tracked Priestman Mustang excavator, finishing construction of the up platform wall, regrading of the cattle dock track bed and preparations for track-laying, and the connection of the station to the mains drainage system.

The NDR submitted in December 2020 a planning application for the extension, this was approved in April 2021 with permission to extend the line 400 m north of the station. Trees were felled and bushes cleared on the section of the embankment between the station and Lamb House Bridge. In accordance with the planning permission granted by Dorset Council, a temporary diversion was created allowing the public to use the Trailway whilst a new Trailway was constructed along the eastern side of the embankment so that the trackbed for the Northern extension could be restored along the western side of the embankment. The Trailway diversion was completed during the Summer of 2022 and officially opened in August by Simon Hoare, MP. Throughout the summer of 2022 work continued reconstructing the embankment to the north of Lamb House Bridge. This had been excavated after the closure of the line to allow the construction of a tennis court. In October 2022 work started excavating spoil that had been dumped on the embankment during the construction of the industrial estate and transferring it over the bridge to complete the reconstruction of the embankment. In February 2023 a temporary diversion of the permissive path at the North end of the station was created allowing the construction of a pedestrian level crossing. The permissive path was restored and the last hump of soil obstructing the line of the trackbed for the extension was removed.

History

After the closure of Shillingstone railway station on 7 March 1966, and a few years post closure, the Dorset County Council purchased the trackbed for a proposed Shillingstone by-pass.

Various furniture manufacturing companies were sited in the former station yard, and over 1970s, industrial buildings were constructed, some of them making partial use of the station building.

By December 2002, the by-pass plan had been shelved and the station was derelict.

Dorset County Council decided to dispose of the redundant station, and, after protracted negotiations, lasting from 1998 to 2005, the North Dorset Railway Trust took signed a lease for the former station site.

The Trust's plan is to reopen the station as a tourist attraction, and restore the site to as it looked in the 1950s and 60s.

Restoration work commenced in 2006, and over the years, the main building was repaired, a replica signal box with a correct Stevens frame  and tablet machines, was constructed by volunteers. The Porter's office was reconstructed, and the Parcels office restored. Track-work within the station was completed by the summer of 2020.

Rolling stock

Hudswell Clarke 0-6-0 Diesel Loco “Ashdown” Works Number D1186 
 JŽ Class 62  Nos. 30075 and 30076. The Jugoslovenske Železnice (JŽ; Yugoslavian Railways) class 62 was a class formed of 106 ex-United States Army Transportation Corps S100 Class 0-6-0T steam locomotives, surplus after the Second World War, plus about 90 similar examples built by Đuro Đaković of Slavonski Brod, Croatia between 1952 and 1961.
 62-669 (built 1960)  "30075" Boiler has been stripped and repaired and will soon be reinstalled.
 62-521 (built 1954)  "30076" Complete, kept as static.
 DS1169  Ruston & Hornsby 48DS class  diesel-mechanical shunter, works No.305302 was new to Ransome Hoffman Pollard, Annfield Plain, Co Durham in 1951. Arrived in Shillingstone in 2015, and restored as former Yeovil Junction permanent way department shunter .

Coaches
 MK1 BR M25424 Built 1957. Purchased by the Swanage Railway, but was sold to Shillingstone in 2011.

Wagons
Senior Naval Stores Officer (SNSO), 10 ton 4w van, SNSO 535. Built in 1910 for the Admiralty initially at Chatham Dockyard, later at Gosport. Purchased from Gosport in March 1984 and moved to West Somerset Railway. In 2005 this van was  donated to Shillingstone. Currently under restoration.
Esso 4w Fuel Oil Tank 3957, Departmental No DB999088, Internal user number 083548. Ex Bournemouth West depot waste oil tanker then was bought by the Swanage railway, before moving to Shillingstone.
 L&NWR 4w Non-Vent 10 Ton Box Van, Diagram number	88,  Navy number RNAD 335, ex RNAD Bedenham. Moved from Washford to Shillingstone Feb 2016. Currently under restoration.
 GWR 10t Ventilated Van 11451 (Code: MINK) Built by GWR at Swindon in 1901 on Lot 418 to Diagram V5. Moved from Washford to Shillingstone Feb 2016.
 BR Dogfish ballast wagon. B983184 moved to Shillingstone from Queenborough Rolling Mill in 2013. The Dogfish & Catfish were BR's standard small ballast hopper wagons, almost 2000 being built. Fitted with vacuum brakes from new, many lasted into the 1990s while a program to fit air-brakes to surviving Dogfish wagons was started in 2000. Despite this, the last examples of both types were withdrawn in 2006.
 BR ADB904131, 21 ton lowmac transporter wagon, GWR style riveted, Vacuum brake [Diag 2-245 Lot 2592, Built Swindon 1949.

Former Exhibits
 LMS 20 Ton Brake Van 950194 Scrapped on site.
 Ruston & Hornsby diesel shunter, arrived in 2007 at Shillingstone. 88DS class, works number 466629 Built 1962, supplied new to Ransomes Simms & Jeffries, of Ipswich. Sold to the Whitwell & Reepham Preservation Society 2013.
 Mk3a Ex-Virgin cross-country Open First buffet coach No.10224 built by British Rail in 1970 at their Derby works. The Mk 3 saw service with British Rail before joining the ranks of Virgin Trains rolling stock where it worked until retirement in 2002.  It was then stored until 2005 and was used by the Army for bomb disposal training. Purchased for a nominal sum in May 2015, and moved shortly after to Shillingstone. Sold October 2017, and moved off site.
 BR Class 08 0-6-0DE No. 08 995 was built at Horwich Works in October 1959 as number D3854, being renumbered 08 687 in February 1974. It was donated as part of a legacy and the trustees sold it off.
 BR 9F 2-10-0 92207, Built by BR (W) in Swindon "A" Shop during May 1959, 92207 was the 13th-from-last steam locomotive to be built for British Railways. It was part of lot number 429 (the final order for main line steam locomotives by British Rail). The owner removed it from site because of lack of decent workshop facilities.
 Wickham trolley BR LMR Manchester, Type 17a, Built by D Wickham & Co 27/2/1959, BR No TP57P, Works No 8267. Currently in secure storage.

See also
 New Somerset and Dorset Railway

References

External links
 Official site

Heritage railways in Dorset
Railway museums in England
Museums in Dorset